The 1997 Spengler Cup was held in Davos, Switzerland from December 26 to December 31, 1997.  All matches were played at host HC Davos's home Eisstadion Davos. The final was won 8-3 by Team Canada over Färjestad BK.

Team Canada was coached by Andy Murray.

Teams participating
 Team Canada
 HC Davos (host)
 Jokerit
 Färjestad BK
 Mannheimer ERC

Tournament

Round-Robin results

All times local (CET/UTC +1)

Finals

References

External links
Hockey Canada Site

1997-98
1997–98 in Swiss ice hockey
1997–98 in German ice hockey
1997–98 in Canadian ice hockey
1997–98 in Finnish ice hockey
1997–98 in Swedish ice hockey
December 1997 sports events in Europe